Sikongo is a constituency of the National Assembly of Zambia. It covers Sikongo District in Western Province.

List of MPs

References 

Constituencies of the National Assembly of Zambia 
1973 establishments in Zambia 
Constituencies established in 1973